The Opitonui River is a river of the Coromandel Peninsula in New Zealand's North Island. It flows north to reach the peninsula's east coast at Whangapoua Harbour, close to the small settlement of Te Rerenga. The river provides a water supply for Matarangi by way of a pipe laid across the Whangapoua harbour.

See also
List of rivers of New Zealand

References

Thames-Coromandel District
Rivers of Waikato
Rivers of New Zealand